Gladiators is a British television series which aired on Sky One (now Sky Max) from 11 May 2008 to 25 October 2009. It was a revival of the earlier series of the same name and based on the American version of the show. The US, UK and Australian versions of the show were all revived in 2008.

For the first series, the show was hosted by Ian Wright and Kirsty Gallacher with original Referee John Anderson returning. For the second series Ian Wright was joined by Caroline Flack due to Kirsty Gallacher not wanting to return. Another change was the removal of John Anderson due to the producers wanting to give the show its own feel and cut ties with the original series. He was replaced by well known boxing referee John Coyle for series two. The winners of the series each earned £50,000.

The show was cancelled in May 2009 by then director of programmes, Stuart Murphy. A second revival is set to be broadcast on BBC One and BBC iPlayer in 2023.

Format
Series one featured 32 contenders (16 male, 16 female). Men and women competed in separate tournaments, with two men and two women competing in each episode. Contenders took part in events against the Gladiators, trying to earn as many points as possible before the final event, the Eliminator. In that event, each point separating the contenders translated into a half-second advantage. The four events leading up to the final were selected from a total of eleven events.

The grand prize in Series 1 was £50,000 per winning contender.

Changes from the original series
The show featured a lineup of new Gladiators, with new costumes. However, Amazon, Panther, Siren and Warrior share names with gladiators from the original UK series and several others share names with those from international series. Many of the Gladiator costumes were noticeably more revealing than in the original series, with male Gladiators Atlas and Oblivion in particular wearing very little.

Due to Sky One's greater advertising requirements, and contestant interviews prior to each of the events starting, the number of events before the Eliminator was cut from five to four.

The revival also featured new music.

Events

The new Gladiators studio set meant that there was only room for 11 events, 9 events from the original series: Duel, Gauntlet, Hang Tough, Hit & Run, Powerball, Pursuit, Pyramid, The Wall and Suspension Bridge. The two new events were Earthquake and Rocketball, which originated in the first and second American Gladiators series respectively.

Notable changes from the original series include Duel, Hang Tough, Hit & Run, Pursuit and Suspension Bridge now being played over water.  The revised Eliminator featured a swimming section, a climb to the top of the Pyramid and (for series 2) two Travelators.

The Gladiators

Female Gladiators

Male Gladiators

Leader of the pack
Wolf (who featured in all eight series of the original Gladiators) returned to be the Gladiators' "Leader of the Pack". He featured in all episodes of series 2. His real name is Michael Van Wijk.

Series winners

Series One (2008)
Male winner: Simon Wray
Female winner: Anna Miller

Series Two (2009)
Male winner: David Staff
Female winner: Kathryn Evans

Champion of Champions (2009)
Male winner: David Staff
Female winner: Anna Miller

Music
All the music to the new series was specially composed by British composer Paul Farrer also known for his music for The Weakest Link and Dancing on Ice. Other artists' music has been used in certain events.

Injuries

Series One
According to reports, at least one contestant has had to withdraw from the opening episode, while one of the Gladiators slipped on a bridge and had to leave the set. Another Gladiator had a stomach bug and Enigma suffered from an injured ankle. In addition, Enigma was involved in an incident on Gauntlet where Leanne Lennox kicked a ram rod into her face, resulting in a confrontation and then her being disqualified. Contenders also suffered injuries including a broken toe suffered by Nicola Trench on Earthquake, a damaged knee suffered by Gavin Sunshine in Gauntlet, a shoulder injury suffered by Joel Grant Jones in Powerball, as well as Greg Kirk suffering a broken arm in the quarter finals during Powerball. One contender, Gavin Sunshine, was so badly injured that he refused to start after his whistle and the other contender, Kevin Dixon, won the show by default.

Sky1 responded to say that health and safety is their number one issue, and they want to minimise the injuries, but pointed out that; "This is Gladiators - a tough physical show for athletes. It's not Family Fortunes!"

Series Two

In the second episode of "Gladiators: The Legends Strike Back" female legend Scorpio suffered an ankle fracture while participating in The Wall.

In the fourth episode, a female contestant, Gemma Green had to pull out due to sustaining a knee injury in Gauntlet just before the Eliminator. David Staff broke his nose during the semi-finals while on Earthquake with Doom. However he went on to score points. He later went on to win the eliminator and eventually went on to win the series as Male champion. He also competed on the champion of champions special, aired on 5 April 2009, and won. Also Gladiator Warrior sustained an injury during gauntlet where contender Justin Thompson clashed and hit his head, and cut just above his eye. He was taken off and fellow gladiator “The Big O” Oblivion took his spot.

Gladiators G-Zone
Originally advertised as Gladiators: G-Force, this short ten-minute program profiled a selection of the gladiators, including Spartan, Panther and Atlas. With a 2min profile of Oblivion, not previously shown, appearing as part of a repeat run.

Transmissions

Original series

Specials

References

External links
Gladiators at Sky One website
 
BBC Wear Warrior feature – Gladiator (from Durham)... Ready!
 

2008 British television series debuts
2009 British television series endings
2000s British game shows
2000s British reality television series
British television series based on American television series
English-language television shows
Gladiators (franchise)
Sky UK original programming
Television series by Banijay
Television series reboots